Nino Tsilosani (born 19 February 1982) is a Georgian politician. Since 2016 he is a member of the Parliament of Georgia of the 9th convocation.

Biography
In 2002 she Graduated from Tbilisi State University, Faculty of International Economic Relations, Master's degree. In 2007 she passed the Audit Training Course (Association of Chartered Certified Accountants); In 2015, she studied the basics of policy at Oxford University.

Experience
 2003–2007 worked as the Head of the Department of Economy and Finance in JSC "Electric Wagon Repair Factory";
 2008–2011 – Head of the Department of Economy and Finance, "Wagon Repair Company" Ltd;
 2011 – Chairman of the Supervisory Board, LLC "Wagon Repair Company";
 2014 – Founder and President of the Tsilosani Foundation;
 Since 2016 she is a member of the Parliament of Georgia of the 9th convocation , Secretary of the Georgian Dream faction;
Fluent in English and Russian .

References

1982 births
Living people
Members of the Parliament of Georgia
21st-century politicians from Georgia (country)
Georgian Dream politicians